The titles of Duke of Elchingen (French: Duc d'Elchingen) and Prince of the Moskva (Prince de la Moskowa) were created by Napoleon, Emperor of the French, for the Marshal of the Empire Michel Ney. Both were victory titles; Ney was created Duke of Elchingen in 1808, after the Battle of Elchingen, and Prince of the Moskva after the Battle of Borodino near a branch of the Moskva River, 125 km outside Moscow (named Bataille de la Moskova in French, in reference to the river). In 1814, Ney became a peer of France. On his execution in 1815, the peerage was revoked, but it was restored in 1831.

Clauses in the titles' patents of creation caused the title of Prince of the Moskva to pass to Ney's eldest son, Joseph, and the dukedom of Elchingen to pass to his second son, Michel. This ensured that the two titles would never be held by the same person if there was another heir living, a similar situation to the British titles of Duke of Hamilton and Earl of Selkirk. 

The two titles were reunited in one person in 1928, and both became extinct with the death of the last heir in 1969.

Ducs d'Elchingen (1808)

Michel Ney, 1st Duke of Elchingen (1769–1815)
Michel Louis Félix Ney, 2nd Duke of Elchingen (1804–1854), second son of the 1st duc, confirmed in his title in 1826
Michel Aloys Ney, 3rd Duke of Elchingen (1835–1881), only son of the 2nd duc
Charles Aloys Jean Gabriel Ney, 4th Duke of Elchingen (1873–1933), younger son of the 3rd duc, succeeded as 5th Prince of the Moskva in 1928
Michel Georges Napoléon Ney, 5th Duke of Elchingen, 6th Prince of the Moskva (1905–1969)

Princes de la Moskowa (1813)

Michel Ney, 1st Prince of the Moskva (1769–1815)
Napoléon Joseph Ney, 2nd Prince of the Moskva (1803–1857), eldest son of the 1st prince
Edgar Napoléon Henry Ney, 3rd Prince of the Moskva (1812–1882), fourth son of the 1st prince
Léon Napoléon Louis Michel Ney, 4th Prince of the Moskva (1870–1928), elder son of the 3rd Duke of Elchingen
Charles Aloys Jean Gabriel Ney, 5th Prince of the Moskva, 4th Duke of Elchingen (1873–1933), younger son of the 3rd Duke of Elchingen
Michel Georges Napoléon Ney, 6th Prince of the Moskva, 5th Duke of Elchingen (1905–1969)

External links
 Héraldique européenne: Maison Ney (European Heraldry: House of Ney, in French)

 
 
Lists of princes
Noble titles created in 1813